The Centro Dramático Nacional ("National Drama Centre" or CDN) is a Madrid-based Spanish theatre company operating under the Instituto de las Artes Escénicas y de la Música (Institute for Performing Arts and Music), an autonomous body of the Spanish Ministry of Culture. It is headquartered in two theatres: the Teatro María Guerrero and the Teatro Valle-Inclán.

External links
 

National theatres
Theatre companies in Spain